Sopocka in Polish cuisine is the name given to a salted (cured) and slightly smoked cut of pork. It is similar to the German kassler.

See also

 List of smoked foods

References

Polish cuisine
Pork
Polish words and phrases
Smoked meat